Rouville was a federal electoral district in Quebec, Canada, that was represented in the House of Commons of Canada from 1867 to 1917.

It was created by the British North America Act, 1867, and was abolished in 1914 when it was merged into St. Hyacinthe—Rouville riding.

Members of Parliament

This riding elected the following Members of Parliament:

Election results

By-election: On Mr. Brodeur being appointed Minister of Inland Revenue, 19 January 1904

See also 

 List of Canadian federal electoral districts
 Past Canadian electoral districts

External links
Riding history from the Library of Parliament

Former federal electoral districts of Quebec